The fourteenth series of Warsaw Shore, a Polish television programme based in Warsaw, Poland was announced in July 2020 and will begin on 15 November 2020. The photos were taken in Warsaw, in compliance with all safety rules related to the COVID-19 pandemic. This was the first series not to include Anastasiya Yandaltsava, Gábor "Gabo" Szabó, and Marceli Szklanny after their departures the previous season. It was also the first series to include five new cast members Kinga Gondorowicz, Maciek Szczukiewicz, Daniel "Arnold" Jabłoński, Michał Eliszer and Paulina Karbowiak. Jakub "Ptyś" Henke returned to the show as the boss.

Cast 
 Damian "Dzik" Graf
 Daniel "Arnold" Jabłoński
 Radosław "Diva" Majchrowski
 Ewa Piekut
 Ewelina "Ewelona" Kubiak
 Joanna Bałdys
 Kasjusz "Don Kasjo" Życiński
 Kinga Gondorowicz
 Maciek Szczukiewicz
 Michał Eliszer
 Milena Łaszek
 Patryk Spiker
 Paulina Karbowiak
 Piotr "Pedro" Polak (Episodes 1–5)

Duration of cast

Notes 

 Key:  = "Cast member" is featured in this episode.
 Key:  = "Cast member" arrives in the house.
 Key:  = "Cast member" leaves the series.
 Key:  = "Cast member" is not a cast member in this episode.

Episodes

References

2020 Polish television seasons
2021 Polish television seasons
Series 14